Guitarrón or guitarron is a common name for a number of stringed instruments found in Latin America and may refer to:
 Guitarrón argentino, a six-stringed musical instrument from Argentina
 Guitarrón chileno, a 25-stringed, plucked instrument from Chile
 Guitarrón mexicano, a six-stringed, plucked instrument from Mexico
 Niibori-style Guitarrón, an instrument 2 octaves below the standard guitar, as per , used in Guitar Orchestras

de:Guitarrón
fi:Guitarrón
fr:Guitarrón
it:Guitarrón
ja:ギタロン
nl:Guitarrón
no:Guitarrón
oc:Guitarrón
ru:Гитаррон